was a town located in Kesen District, Iwate Prefecture, Japan, now part of Ōfunato, Iwate.

History
The village of Sanriku was created on September 30, 1956 with the merger of the villages of Yoshihama, Okirai and Ryori, all from Kesen District.

On November 15, 2001, Sanriku was merged into the expanded city of Ōfunato and no longer exists as an independent municipality.

As of September 30, 2005, the town had an estimated population of 8,322 and a population density of 60.69 persons per km². The total area was 137.13 km².

External links
 Official website of Ōfunato 

Dissolved municipalities of Iwate Prefecture